Desert Dancer is a 2014 British biographical drama film directed by Richard Raymond and written by Jon Croker. Starring Reece Ritchie and Freida Pinto, the film is based on the true story of Afshin Ghaffarian, a young, self-taught dancer in Iran, who risked his life for his dream to become a dancer despite a nationwide dancing ban.

Plot
Set in Iran, the story follows the ambition of Afshin Ghaffarian. During the volatile climate of the 2009 presidential election, Afshin and some friends (including Elaheh played by Freida Pinto) risk their lives and form an underground dance company. The group learned the dancing from videos of  Michael Jackson, Gene Kelly and Rudolf Nureyev even though the online videos are banned. Afshin and Elaheh also learn much from each other and learned how to embrace their passion for dance and for one another.

Cast
 Reece Ritchie as Afshin Ghaffarian
 Joshan Ertan as voice of young Afshin
 Freida Pinto as Elaheh
 Nazanin Boniadi as Parisa Ghaffarian
 Tom Cullen as Ardavan
 Marama Corlett as Mona
 Simon Kassianides as Sattar
 Akin Gazi as Farid Ghaffarian
 Tolga Safer as Stephano
 Makram Khoury as Mehdi

Production
Richard Raymond makes his full-length film directorial debut working with acclaimed choreographer Akram Khan, whose work featured in the Olympic opening ceremony at London 2012.  Raymond produced the film through his May 13 Films banner. Freida Pinto undertook an intensive training schedule for the role that comprised eight hours of dance rehearsals every day for 14 weeks. Photo call for the film was held at the Palais des Festivals during the third day of the 65th annual Cannes Film Festival in Cannes, France on Friday May 18, 2012. Relativity Media acquired North America distribution rights to the film  at 2013 American Film Market.

Release
Desert Dancer premiered in Germany on July 3, 2014. It opened the Ischia Global Film and Music Fest in Ischia, Italy on July 13, 2014. The film premiered in Hong Kong on August 28, 2014 and in the United States on April 10, 2015.

Reception
The film received a mixed reception from critics. The website's critics consensus reads: "Desert Dancer never finds an agreeable rhythm, resulting in a musical drama that doesn't deliver on the promised spectacle or political commentary."

References

External links
 
 
 
 
 Desert Dancer at Starland.pro
 Desert Dancer at Publikart.net

2014 films
English-language Emirati films
English-language Romanian films
English-language Moroccan films
2014 biographical drama films
British biographical drama films
Emirati biographical films
Emirati drama films
Romanian biographical drama films
Moroccan drama films
2010s dance films
Films set in Iran
Films set in 2009
Films shot in London
Films shot in Morocco
Films shot in Paris
Films scored by Benjamin Wallfisch
Relativity Media films
British dance films
2014 drama films
Biographical films about dancers
2010s English-language films
2010s British films